Daviesia trigonophylla is a species of flowering plant in the family Fabaceae and is endemic to the south of Western Australia. It is an erect, bushy shrub with elliptic or egg-shaped phyllodes that are triangular in cross-section, and orange, dark red and maroon flowers.

Description

Taxonomy
Daviesia trigonophylla was first formally described in 1848 by Carl Meissner in Lehmann's Plantae Preissianae. The specific epithet (trigonophylla) means "triangular-leaved", referring to the cross-sectional shape of the phyllodes.

Distribution and habitat
This daviesia usually grows in mallee in the Stirling Range and nearby coastal areas in the Avon Wheatbelt, Esperance Plains and Jarrah Forest bioregions of southern Western Australia.

Conservation status
Daviesia trigonophylla is classified as "not threatened" by the Government of Western Australia Department of Biodiversity, Conservation and Attractions.

References

trigonophylla
Rosids of Western Australia
Plants described in 1848
Taxa named by Carl Meissner